Lynda Rae Resnick (born 1943) is an American billionaire businesswoman. Resnick is married to Stewart Resnick, who is her business partner, and through their holding company The Wonderful Company, they own the POM Wonderful and Fiji Water brands, Wonderful Pistachios and Almonds, Wonderful Halos, JUSTIN Wines, Landmark Wines, JNSQ Wines and the Teleflora floral wire service company.

Early life
Resnick was born Lynda Rae Harris to a Jewish family in Baltimore, Maryland, and raised in Philadelphia, Pennsylvania. Her father, Jack H. Harris, worked as a film distributor during the 1950s; he is known for producing The Blob, which later became a cult favorite. Her mother, Muriel (née Goodman), was an interior designer. Because of her father's occupation, Resnick, at the age of four, had a recurring role on The Horn & Hardart Children's Hour broadcast from WCAU-TV in Philadelphia. Resnick graduated from Harriton High School, and the family moved to southern California. After a brief stint at a local college, Resnick took a job at the in-house ad agency for Sunset House catalog. Resnick founded an advertising agency, Lynda Limited, at the age of 19.

Pentagon Papers
Resnick, then Lynda Sinay, began doing occasional work for the antiwar movement during the Vietnam War era. By the fall of 1969, Resnick (then Lynda Sinay) was divorced and dating Anthony J. Russo, an engineer at the Rand Corp., a think tank in Santa Monica, Calif. He prevailed on her to allow him and a colleague, Daniel Ellsberg, to duplicate a large document using the Xerox 812 machine in her ad agency.
Starting the night of Oct. 1, Russo, Ellsberg and various helpers copied 7,000 pages of the government-ordered secret history of America's involvement in Vietnam: the Pentagon Papers.

Her friend, Daniel Ellsberg, asked to use her copy machine on nights and weekends in order to distribute top-secret military documents. Ellsberg gave these documents to The New York Times, which then published them. Dubbed the Pentagon Papers, they detailed aspects of the war hidden from the public and damaged the credibility of the presidents involved. Resnick was designated an un-indicted co-conspirator for her role and pursued by prosecutors for two years. Legal actions were eventually dropped.

Career and companies
Lynda Resnick has been involved in many companies. The Wonderful Company, formerly Roll Global, is a holding company which the Resnicks use to facilitate their various business ventures. Notable brands controlled by the Resnicks include POM Wonderful, Fiji Water, Wonderful Halos and Wonderful Pistachios. They also operate large industrial citrus and nut farms in California. The Resnicks met while he was president of American Protection Industries, Los Angeles, California, and she was pitching her ad agency to get his business.

The Resnicks purchased Teleflora in 1979, at which time Lynda left her advertising job to become the company's executive vice president of marketing and eventually president. As Vice-Chair and co-owner of Teleflora's holding company, Resnick has been involved with securing flagship TV sponsorship roles. She won a Gold Effie Award for her idea to pair fresh flowers with a collectible keepsake container, while her Mother's Day special on NBC resulted in another Effie win. January 2009 saw her company's first Super Bowl advertisement, which was voted one of the best Super Bowl ads by several newspapers, blogs, and online fan sites.

Franklin Mint

The Resnicks purchased the Franklin Mint in 1984; Lynda began directing the company's international marketing efforts, a position she held until 2000. She influenced a new business plan of providing products that delivered "emotional satisfaction", such as the high-end collectible doll business. According to the Encyclopedia of American Women in Business, the first run of a Scarlett O'Hara (Gone with the Wind)-inspired doll generated $35 million in sales. Also during her tenure, licensing was arranged for products related to the Louvre art museum in Paris, the Vatican, board games like Monopoly and Scrabble, classic cars, and famous people like John Wayne, Elvis Presley, and Marilyn Monroe. In 1997 Tiger Woods successfully stopped the Franklin Mint from selling a commemorative medal of his win in the 1997 Masters Tournament. The Resnicks sold the Franklin Mint in 2006.

POM Wonderful 

According to her memoir, she acquired a pistachio orchard that also contained some Wonderful variety pomegranate trees in California's San Joaquin Valley. In 1996, intrigued by folklore, she began to sponsor medical research regarding the pomegranate's health effects. By 2000 there was research published with findings regarding effects of regular pomegranate consumption. Resnick designed the POM Wonderful logo, and her design team developed an hourglass-shape bottle, the company later expanding into other liquid products and pills.

Fiji Water 

The Resnicks acquired the Fiji Water business in 2004, after which Lynda supervised marketing that focused on promoting the uniqueness and exotic nature of the water. According to Resnick's book, sales of Fiji Water soon increased by 300% by 2008, becoming the largest imported bottled water brand in the United States. In response to bad publicity regarding the Fiji brand and bottled water in general Resnick introduced a promotional campaign touting an environmental policy and plans for a reduced carbon footprint through a series of press releases.

Wonderful Halos 
In 2013 the Resnicks launched Wonderful Halos mandarins, with a $220 million facility in the San Joaquin Valley capable of processing 19 million mandarins a day. By 2017 Halos was the #1 segment brand, forecast to have around 70-80% market share by 2018. Company executives credit Resnick with the choice to retain Roll Global's mandarin operations in 2013 despite strong competition from existing brands, and as the key architect of Halos branding. In 2017, Halos accounted for around three-quarters of growth in the mandarin category, and 12% of total produce sales growth.

Wonderful Pistachios and Almonds 
Known for its Get Crackin''' campaign, Wonderful Pistachios was the United States' fastest-growing snack brand and the number-one tree nut brand in 2018.  

 JNSQ Wines 
In 2019, the Resnicks launched a female-focused luxury wine brand, JNSQ (named for the French phrase "je ne sais quoi"). JNSQ Rosé Cru and JNSQ Sauvignon Blanc made their debut alongside the Fall/Winter 2019 collection from California-born designers Kate and Laura Mulleavy of Rodarte, who brought their show to Los Angeles (instead of New York Fashion Week) on February 5. Lynda Resnick described the brand as "created specifically for millennial women and older Gen Z'ers and the milestones they are celebrating in their blossoming and exhilarating lives. It's a wine made with that same shared quality of 'je ne sais quoi' that makes each of these ladies unique, memorable and unstoppable.” Designed to be sustainably reused, the curvaceous wine bottle was inspired by a vintage perfume bottle and comes with a rose- or grape-shaped glass stopper. "We live in an age where we don't want single-use things; we want things that last," Resnick, who is heavily involved in the product design, told The Hollywood Reporter.

Personal philanthropy

Resnick is a "life trustee" of the Los Angeles County Museum of Art's Board of Trustees. She is a trustee emeritus of the Philadelphia Museum of Art. In September 2008, she and her husband announced a $45 million gift to the Los Angeles County Museum of Art for the construction of a new exhibition pavilion, as well as $10 million in artworks.

She is on the executive board of UCLA Medical Sciences, the Prostate Cancer Foundation and the Milken Family Foundation. In 2005 the Resnick Neuropsychiatric Hospital was named for Resnick and her husband in honor of their involvement. They made a $4 million donation to Children's Hospital Central California in 2006.

She is on the board of trustees and chair of the marketing and communications committee at the Aspen Institute. In 2009 they announced the opening of a pre-school billed as one of the first in the US to be environmentally friendly. The same year they also announced plans to bring a charter school, Paramount Bard Academy, to the Central Valley. At Caltech's 2009 graduation ceremonies, the university announced that the Resnicks had donated $20 million towards a "sustainability center" to be named after themselves.

In 2018, the Hammer Museum in Los Angeles announced a $30 million gift from Lynda and Stewart Resnick to help pay for a renovation and expansion project.

In September 2019, Lynda Resnick and her husband pledged $750 million to the California Institute of Technology for environmental sustainability research.

 Central Valley philanthropy 
Resnick and The Wonderful Company have made significant improvements to the communities that dot California's Central Valley since 2010, especially in the city of Lost Hills, where half of the homes have at least one family member working at The Wonderful Company. Over the years, they have given over $100 million to two charter schools, and $20 million to an agriculture-career college prep program for seven public high schools in California's Central Valley.Forbes noted that between 2010 and 2015 "the company has helped 55,000 students in the region through programs like college prep, scholarships and summer camps. One education program they built and partially funded, which was awarded an $8.5 million grant from the state in June 2015 to help them expand it, gives 200 students a year partial agricultural education and college scholarships to gain technical experience. It will reach 2,000 students in four years."

Additionally, Resnick and The Wonderful Company have been leaders in minimum wage increases. In 2019 the company increased its minimum pay to $15 an hour for all of its California workers, three years ahead of the state-mandated deadline. In 2006 Resnick introduced the Wonderful Giving Program, allowing employees to direct donations to local charities. The largest local recipient of donations under the program is Wasco Union High School, which during the past twelve years has received more than $210,000 thanks to Wonderful Giving. Lost Hills Elementary School, the program's second-leading recipient, has taken in $141,000.

Other local nonprofits that have benefited financially from the program include the Bakersfield Homeless Center ($77,852), the Bakersfield Ronald McDonald House ($70,633), Marley Mutts Dog Rescue ($63,586), Youth 2 Leaders ($62,400) and the Kern County chapter of the Wounded Heroes Fund ($34,310). In 2018, the Resnicks donated $2.5 million to the Fresno Community Food Bank, the largest donation the agency has received in its 26-year history.

In 2016 the US Chamber of Commerce recognized Resnick and The Wonderful Company with their Corporate Citizenship Award for their work in community improvement.

Personal life
Resnick has been married twice. Her first marriage to publisher Hershel Sinay ended in divorce in 1969. They had two children: Jason Sinay and Jonathan Sinay.UCLA Health System: "Hershel Sinay"  retrieved June 7, 2014 Resnick's second marriage is to Stewart Resnick, who is also her business partner. They live in Beverly Hills and have a home in Aspen, Colorado.

Personal memoir
In 2009, Resnick, with Francis Wilkinson, co-authored a book, Rubies in the Orchard: How to Uncover the Hidden Gems in Your Business, which details her life by explaining marketing and business ideas she used to build successful brands. In a U.S. News & World Report article, Resnick explained that her book promotes a concept she labels transparency: "Transparency is very new...you have to be a good citizen of the planet. You have to give back."

Criticisms
Growing water-intensive nut tree crops (a single almond requires  of water) in the Central Valley drew criticism during the 2011–17 California drought. According to Forbes, Wonderful Company uses "at least 120 billion gallons [] a year, two-thirds on nuts, enough to supply San Francisco's 852,000 residents for a decade." As part of their efforts to minimize this impact, the Resnicks have been investing heavily in the growth of the local economy and nutrition centers. As The New York Times notes, "in Lost Hills there are new health centers, new pre-K facilities, new housing projects, new gardens, new sidewalks and lights, a new community center and a new soccer field." In addition, the Resnicks own a majority stake in the Kern Water Bank, "one of California's largest underground water storage facilities. It is capable of storing 500 billion gallons [] of water. They have also partnered with the Central Valley Project and the State Water Project to bring water to Kern County, spending $35 million in recent years to buy up more water from nearby districts to replenish the Central Valley's supplies.

At the same time as exporting almonds to Asia and other locations, they import Fiji bottled water from the South Pacific. Some foreign conservationists criticize the Resnicks for "hogging the archipelago's precious water supply... while island natives didn't always have water to drink themselves, due to crumbling and insufficient infrastructure." However, local officials support the investment Fiji water makes in the economy as "a critical contributor to the Fijian economy... and a gift to the Fijian tourism industry."

In addition, their claims for the POM pomegranate drink have been contested. According to Forbes'', "The Federal Trade Commission filed a complaint in 2010 that the Resnicks' POM Wonderful had used deceptive advertising when marketing the antioxidant-rich drink as being able to treat, prevent or reduce the risk of heart disease, prostate cancer and erectile dysfunction. In 2012 a federal judge agreed that some of the ads were misleading. In 2013 FTC commissioners denied the Resnicks' appeal. In October 2015, the Resnicks asked the Supreme Court to take the case." In May 2016 the Supreme Court declined to take the case.

References

External links

 Lynda Resnick's Huffington Post column

American business executives
American women business executives
American company founders
American women company founders
Businesspeople from Los Angeles
The Wonderful Company
Living people
American billionaires
Female billionaires
American bloggers
American women bloggers
American women philanthropists
Philanthropists from California
Jewish American philanthropists
People associated with the Los Angeles County Museum of Art
Businesspeople from Philadelphia
People from Beverly Hills, California
20th-century American businesspeople
21st-century American businesspeople
1943 births
Harriton High School alumni
20th-century American businesswomen
21st-century American businesswomen
21st-century American Jews